David Verdaguer (born 28 September 1983) is a Spanish actor and comedian. His career include works both in Spanish and Catalan such as 10,000 km (2014), Summer 1993 (2017), for which he received the Goya Award for Best Supporting Actor and Uno para todos (2020).

Career
He began his career in minor roles in different programs from the Catalan public television channel TV3 such as Plats Bruts (2001), El Cor de la Ciutat (2002–2003) and Ventdelplà (2005). In 2006, he became a part of the comedy show Alguna Pregunta Més? as a reporter.<ref>{{Cite web|url=http://www.emporda.info/oci/2016/04/08/david-verdaguer-retroba-lhomo-apm/309597.html|title=David Verdaguer es retroba amb l'Homo APM?, a lAPM? Extra'|accessdate=August 10, 2021|website=Empordà Info|date= April 8, 2014|language=Catalan}}</ref> In 2008, he got his first main role as Santi in the television series Zoo, about the lives of the workers at the Barcelona Zoo.

Between 2013 and 2014, he participated in the comedy programmes Polònia and Crackòvia doing impressions of several political and sports celebrities and figures. In 2014, he starred in the romantic drama film 10,000 km alongside Natalia Tena, directed by Carlos Marqués-Marcet, his performance in the film was praised by critics and led to his first Goya Award nomination, for Best New Actor, he also won the Gaudí Award for Best Actor in a Leading Role and was nominated for the Feroz Award for Best Main Actor in a Film.

In 2017, he stars in the film Summer 1993 alongside Bruna Cusí and Laia Artigas, directed by Carla Simón, the film received critical acclaim and was selected at the Spanish entry for Best Foreign Language Film at the 90th Academy Awards, though it was not nominated. At the 32nd Goya Awards, the film won three awards out of eight nominations and Verdaguer won Best Supporting Actor. He has collaborated with Carlos Marqués-Marcet two more times, in the films Anchor and Hope (2017) and The Days to Come (2019). In 2020, he starred in Uno para todos'', receiving his third Goya nomination.

Filmography

Film

Television

Awards and nominations

Goya Awards

Gaudí Awards

Feroz Awards

References

External links 
 

1983 births
Living people
Spanish male film actors
Spanish male television actors
21st-century Spanish male actors
Male actors from Catalonia